Banda del Río Salí is a city in the Tucumán Province, Argentina. It is the department seat and the largest and most populated city in the Cruz Alta Department. The 2010 Census counted a population of 63,226.

The city is part of the Greater San Miguel de Tucumán area and its largest employer is the Concepción Sugar Mill, the only remaining such facility after Pres. Juan Carlos Onganía had the state-owned Lastenia Mill closed in 1966.

Populated places in Tucumán Province
Populated places established in 1972
Cities in Argentina
Argentina
Tucumán Province